This Fight Is Our Fight: The Battle to Save America's Middle Class is a 2017 book by American Democratic politician Elizabeth Warren. An audiobook read by Warren herself was published through  Macmillan Audio.

References

Books about politics of the United States
2017 non-fiction books
Books by Elizabeth Warren
Metropolitan Books books